The Voice Senior is an Italian reality singing competition for elders of more than 60 years old, and a senior version of The Voice of Italy. The series is produced by Rai 2 after acquiring the show from the original Holland version, making Italy the 12th country to start producing The Voice Senior. The show began airing on November 27, 2020.

The coaches are Gigi D'Alessio, Clementino, Loredana Bertè and the duo Al Bano & Jasmine Carrisi. The host of the show is Antonella Clerici. On 16 July 2021, it announced that the second season would be produced. With Orietta Berti announcing as the new coach, replacing Al Bano & Jasmine Carrisi. The third season of the reality show premiered in January 13 2023, with Ricchi & Poveri replacing Orietta.

Coaches and host

Coaches 
In October 2020 it was announced that Gigi D'Alessio, Italian rapper Clementino, and Loredana Bertè will be the coaches for the first season of the show. On the same day, it was announced that Al Bano would coach with his daughter, Jasmine Carrisi, as a duo coach. On 16 July 2021, it was announced that Orietta Berti would replace Al Bano and Jasmine for season two.

Host 
It was announced that Antonella Clerici would be the presenter for the first season.

Coaches and finalists 
Color key
Winner in bold, finalists in italic.
 Winner
 Runner-up
 Third place
 Fourth place
 Semi-finalist

Series overview

References 

2020 Italian television series debuts
i
Italian reality television series
RAI original programming